The Nung Chan Monastery (meaning 'Farming Ch'an') is a monastery at Beitou District, Taipei, Taiwan. It is formally founded in 1975 by Ven. Dongchu, a scholar monk and disciple of renowned Chinese Buddhist Master Taixu. It's named ' Farming Ch'an ' as its early residents dedicated themselves to Ch'an practice and grew their own food. Its spirit is based on 8th century Zen Master Baizhang Huaihai's aphorism, "A day without work is a day without food."

Ven. Dongchu bought the  land at Guandu Plain near Taipei in the end of the 1960s. As he didn't have many followers, he worked most of the land by himself and for the first few years, his only improvement is to have the land leveled. It then became a farmland worked by Ven. Dong Chu, his two disciples, and the neighboring villagers. In 1971, Ven. Dongchu finally began to build a two-story farmhouse that still existed today behind the main hall. The building was completed four years later in 1975.

Ven. Dongchu was determined to promote Buddhist culture
in Taiwan and cultivating Buddhist human talent. The monastery became a center for Ven. Dongchu's cultural and educational activity, and annual winter charity events.

In 1978, Ven. Dongchu died and in his will he wanted to be succeeded by his disciple, Ven. Sheng-yen, as the abbot of the monastery. Ven. Sheng-yen was in United States by the time, he was just being elected abbot of a small monastery in Bronx, New York called Temple of Great Enlightenment. But he couldn't refuse his master's will and decided to return to Taiwan.

Under Ven. Sheng-yen's leadership the monastery's devotees increased, and it had to expand its buildings further. The two-story  farmhouse wasn't enough for the growing followers. Under the help of some donors, it then erected several temporary steel buildings. Some of Ven. Sheng-yen's earliest Taiwanese disciples were devotees and monks in Nung Chan.

Throughout the 1980s it continued to expand with temporary buildings as Master Sheng-yen's reputation grew. Its capacity became quite overwhelmed by the late 1980s and finally the organization decided to buy a new plot of land in the mountainous area of Jinshan, Taipei and build the Dharma Drum Mountain (DDM). Until today, after the completion of DDM in Jinshan, Nung Chan continues to serve as DDM's principal branch.

Gallery

See also
 Buddhism in Taiwan
 Ven. Dongchu
 Ven. Sheng-yen
 Dharma Drum Mountain
 Shandao Temple, Zhongzheng District
 Linji Huguo Chan Temple, Zhongshan District
 List of temples in Taiwan

References

External links

 Nung Chang Monastery page from Dharma Drum Mountain

1975 establishments in Taiwan
Chan temples
Dharma Drum Mountain
Buddhist monasteries in Taiwan
Religious buildings and structures in Taipei